Chalcolemia is a monotypic genus of  jumping spiders containing the single species, Chalcolemia nakanai. It was first described by J. X. Zhang & Wayne Paul Maddison in 2012, and is only found on New Britain.

References

Monotypic Salticidae genera
Salticidae
Spiders of Oceania